Franciscan Sisters may refer to:

 Franciscan Sisters of Christian Charity
 Franciscan Sisters of the Eucharist
 Franciscan Sisters of Mary
 Franciscan Sisters of Perpetual Adoration
 Franciscan Sisters of the Sacred Heart
 Society of the Atonement, Roman Catholic, formerly Episcopal, Franciscan religious society
 Third Order of Saint Francis
 Missionary Sisters of the Immaculate Conception of the Mother of God

See also
 Sisters of St. Francis (disambiguation)